The ACW Hardcore Championship was the top professional wrestling hardcore championship title in the American independent promotion Assault Championship Wrestling. Ron Zombie was declared the first-ever champion in Meriden, Connecticut on August 24, 2001. The championship was regularly defended throughout the state of Connecticut, most often in Meriden, Connecticut, until the promotion closed in early-2004.

Ron Zombie holds the record for most reigns as a 4-time champion. At 196 days, The Mutilators' (Jamie Pain and Nemesis) reign is the longest in the title's history. Ron Zombie and Mike E. Milano, both losing the title at the same show in which they had won it, share the record for the shortest reigns. Overall, there have been 11 reigns shared between 10 wrestlers, with no vacancies.

Title history

Reigns

Combined reigns

References

External links
Official ACW Junior Heavyweight Championship Title History
ACW Junior Heavyweight Championship at Genickbruch.com

Hardcore wrestling championships